MSC Seashore is a Seaside EVO-class cruise ship built for MSC Cruises at the Fincantieri shipyard in Monfalcone, Italy. As of August 2021, she became the lead ship of MSC's Seaside EVO class, a sub-class of the Seaside-class of ships built with larger dimensions. She will be joined by sister ship named MSC Seascape scheduled for delivery in November 2022.

History

Planning and construction 

On 29 November 2017, at the delivery ceremony of MSC Seaside, MSC announced it had signed an order with Italian shipbuilder Fincantieri worth €1.8 billion for two new cruise ships, scheduled for delivery in 2021 and 2023, respectively. The two ships will make up the Seaside EVO-class, described as a "further evolution of the Seaside-class prototype" established by MSC Seaside and MSC Seaview. The order for the first Seaside EVO ship replaced an order originally placed for a third Seaside-class vessel. Once delivered in summer 2021, the first Seaside EVO ship will become the largest ship to have been built in Italy. 

On 26 November 2018, MSC revealed the name of the first Seaside EVO ship as MSC Seashore, the same day it held the steel-cutting ceremony for the ship at Fincantieri's shipyard in Monfalcone. On 19 September 2019, the keel laying ceremony was performed for the ship, in which two coins were placed under the ship's keel for good fortune. She was floated out on 20 August 2020 and moved to a wet dock to complete her outfitting work. MSC Seashore was delivered in July 2021.

On 22 December 2021, a 15-year old died after falling from a balcony on the ship. The cruise line reported that it appeared to have been a suicide.

Operational career 
Originally set to begin operations with her maiden voyage on 13 June 2021, MSC Seashore was scheduled to sail weekly Western Mediterranean cruises, visiting Barcelona, Marseille, Genoa, Naples, Messina, and Valletta. However, after the COVID-19 pandemic caused construction delays at the shipyard, her debut was postponed to 1 August 2021, forcing MSC to deploy MSC Fantasia on her route until her debut.

Design and specifications 
MSC claims MSC Seashore's changes in her overall design from her older Seaside-class sister ships make up more than 65 percent of the vessel. Onboard, she has expanded guest capacity resulting from 200 additional passenger cabins, with 4,540 passengers at double occupancy or 5,877 passengers at maximum capacity, 758 more than that on Seaside-class ships. The larger deck plan includes space for additional restaurants, lounge space, but less whirlpools. The ship has features designed to enhance the efficiency, such as a selective catalytic reduction system to control the ship's emissions and anti-fouling paint to reduce wave resistance on the ship's hull. The MSC Seashore is the first new cruise ship to feature advanced air sanitation technology. According to MSC, the 'Safe Air' system reduces the risk of catching viruses.

References

Footnotes

Citations 

 
 
 
 
 
 
 
 

Seashore
Ships built by Fincantieri
Ships built in Monfalcone
2020 ships